Ranzuki is a fashion magazine published monthly in Japan by Bunka-sha Publishing & Co.. A gal magazine, Ranzuki mainly targets women in their teens and shows its preference for dark-skin and 109 items.

History
Ranzuki was first published in August 2000 with the name Ranking Daisuki (lit. "Ranking Loving"). Ranzuki later spawned its special edition which became independent as Jelly in 2006.

Model
Ranzuki features its regularly appearing models as "R's" and all of them usually appear on the magazine with their simple nicknames. The notable ones have included Yumi Yamanaka (Yumi-nyan), Aya Suzuki (Suzu), Takami Tsuha (Tah), Namino Hata (Nami-tee), Serika Nakayama (Serry), Yoko Kunieda (Yossan), Nicole Abe (Nikorun), Yui Minemura (Yuikichi or Yu-yu), Rika Mamiya (Rika-chu), Natsumi Saito (Natsuhmi), Arisa Kamada (Ari-chan), Rei Yasui (Rere).

Some of them have moved to the sister magazine Jelly, including Maya Mori, Naomi Arai, Yuki Yamamoto, Mai Miyagi, and Miho Ishigami. Some have moved to Vanilla Girl, a fashion magazine published by Bunka-sha the same publisher.

References

External
Official 

2000 establishments in Japan
Fashion magazines published in Japan
Gyaru
Magazines established in 2000
Magazines published in Tokyo
Monthly magazines published in Japan
Teen magazines published in Japan
Women's fashion magazines
Women's magazines published in Japan